The Claire Saltonstall Bikeway, also known as the Boston to Cape Cod Bikeway, is a 135-mile bikeway marked as Bike Route 1 that starts on the Charles River Bike Path near Boston University in Boston, Massachusetts and winds along Boston's Emerald Necklace, using mostly back roads and bikepaths with occasional stretches of secondary highways. It ends in Provincetown, Massachusetts. The bikeway was named on July 17, 1978, in memory of Claire Saltonstall, the daughter of Senator William L. Saltonstall. Claire was killed by an automobile in 1974 while she was riding her bicycle. Senator Saltonstall was a sponsor of bicycle safety legislation and was instrumental in developing the bikeway. Dual signs were erected along the route shortly after the bikeway opened, one with a picture of a bicycle in a green background and the green number 1 below the picture, and another rectangular sign with the words Claire Saltonstall Bikeway below that. Few of the original signs survive today, however, and new signs were erected in the summer of 2018.

Route Description

This back road bikeway follows various state parkways, highways, and town roads and bike paths. Nearly all of the roads along the bikeway are paved and leave enough room to comfortably ride in a bike lane. The only exception is on the Sagamore Bridge where you must walk your bicycle due to state safety regulations. It passes near many state parks south of Boston, including Blue Hills Reservation, Ames Nowell State Park, Pilgrim Memorial State Park, Myles Standish State Forest, Scusset Beach State Reservation, Nickerson State Park, and Cape Cod National Seashore. Turn by turn directions are given for the three major sections of the bikeway: Greater Boston, Metro South and SE Mass, and Cape Cod going from Boston to Cape Cod.

Boston Area

The first 13 miles of the bikeway begin along the banks of the Charles River near Boston University. The route passes by the school over US 20 and follows its way into the Fenway neighborhood. The bikeway follows down the Riverway bike paths, passing the Longwood Medical Area, down to the Emerald Necklace. The route intersects at  Route 9 and continues down the Jamaicaway. The bikeway has a short congruency with the Arborway before exiting at Centre Street. Going southward, the bikeway flows from Centre Street to VFW Parkway. You must then exit to West Roxbury Parkway at the rotary and pass by the Bellevue MBTA station. Going northward, the bikeway passes by the Bellevue stop and merges onto Centre Street. The route continues down the West Roxbury Parkway, Enneking Parkway, and Turtle Pond Parkway before turning onto the Neponset Valley Parkway, which runs through the Readville section of the city. The bikeway exits onto Blue Hill Avenue onto Route 138 and the route makes its way past the Blue Hills Reservation and I-93 into Canton.

Blue Hills to Sagamore Bridge

The route then travels for 55 miles in metro-south Boston and in suburbs in Southeastern Massachusetts. The route travels past the Blue Hills on MA 138 in Milton and continues into Canton, then turns down Randolph St. which becomes Canton St. in Randolph. It is a concurrent with MA 28 into Avon, where it exits onto E. High St. heading towards Boundary St. and eventually N. Quincy St. in Brockton. It intersects MA 123 and MA 27 before continuing straight to the access road for Massasoit Community College. At the end of the access road, it turns left onto Thatcher St and continues as Elm St. in East Bridgewater. It then turns onto Central St. and intersects at MA 18 as it continues toward Chestnut St., Bridge St., and Crescent St. It then follows down Washington St. until its next turn onto Pond St. which leads into Halifax. It then turns onto Elm St. and continues to Pine St. where it turns east on MA 106 for a short while and then turns onto Carver St. It eventually turns into South St. then onto Franklin St., continuing into Plympton. It travels down Center St. towards MA 58 where it is joined going south into the town center before turning onto Mayflower St. It continues on Colchester Rd. and Brook St. before becoming Elm St. in Kingston where it joins MA 80 for four miles heading down into Plymouth. It turns onto Carver St. and continues past the big intersection (use the rightmost lane) before turning onto Summer St. toward downtown Plymouth. It turns onto MA 3A for half a mile before exiting onto South St. and eventually becoming Long Pond Rd. It passes under MA 3 and continues down toward the Myles Standish State Forest and Plymouth South High School before merging left onto Hedges Pond Rd., where the route will re-meet Route 3A and continue straight onto State Rd. towards the Sagamore Bridge in Bourne.

Riders must use the Sagamore Bridge to cross the Cape Cod Canal, and they must walk their bicycles across the bridge. Access to the bridge is available by going straight on Canal Street just past the Sagamore Park and Ride lot on the right.

Cape Cod

The bikeway continues following back roads and bike paths for 67 miles on Cape Cod starting in Bourne, coming off the Sagamore Bridge onto Adams St. and Sandwich St. which becomes MA 6A. The route turns onto MA 130 heading into Sandwich and passes under US 6, then turns onto Service Rd. passing MA 149 and continuing into Barnstable. It joins MA 132 for a short concurrency before turning onto Phinney's Ln. as it rejoins MA 6A. It continues into Yarmouth and Dennis before turning onto Sentucket Road and Mayfair Road, then joins the Cape Cod Rail Trail through the towns of Harwich, Brewster, Orleans, Eastham, and Wellfleet. The bikeway then makes its way around US 6 through side streets in Truro and finally comes to an end down Commercial Street MA 6A in downtown Provincetown.

References

Transportation in Barnstable County, Massachusetts
Bike paths in Massachusetts
Transportation in Norfolk County, Massachusetts
Transportation in Plymouth County, Massachusetts
Transportation in Suffolk County, Massachusetts